Thackers Airport  is a privately owned, public use airport in Caddo Parish, Louisiana, United States. It is located three nautical miles (6 km) north of the central business district of Oil City.

Facilities and aircraft 
Thackers Airport covers an area of 15 acres (6 ha) at an elevation of 202 feet (62 m) above mean sea level. It has one runway designated 8/26 with a turf surface measuring 2,900 by 50 feet (884 x 15 m).

For the 12-month period ending April 26, 2011, the airport had 650 general aviation aircraft operations, an average of 54 per month. At that time there were two single-engine aircraft based at this airport.

See also 
 List of airports in Louisiana

References

External links 
 Aerial image as of February 1998 from USGS The National Map
 Aeronautical chart at SkyVector

Airports in Louisiana
Transportation in Caddo Parish, Louisiana
Buildings and structures in Caddo Parish, Louisiana